Emma Geary (born November 1977, in Larne, Northern Ireland, United Kingdom), (Artist name: Anarkitty), is a Pop-Surrealist artist from Northern Ireland. She currently lives outside Belfast.

Early life and education 
Emma went to the University of Ulster in Belfast and gained a B.A(Hons) degree in Art and Design, specializing in Visual Communications. After graduation she moved to London for 6 years where she worked for a number of ad agencies and graphic design houses.

Early career 
While working in London for graphic design houses, Emma mostly worked on digital based character illustrations. Her work has appeared in publications such as Creative Review, Computer Arts and DPI (Taiwan) magazine. She also created works for MTV, BBC and Pictoploasma. But it was not before she returned to Northern Ireland that she started to move her characters onto canvas and started her own career.

Anarkitty Works & Style 
After having created Anarkitty as her artist synonym, (she also signs all her works with an illustrated 'AK') her influences came from manga, tattoo, pinup girls, graffiti and toy cultures. She says that she was most inspired by artists like Allen Lee, Brian Fraud, Kay Neelson and Banksy. But also The London Police, Flying Fortress and Dalak. However, she was most inspired by Miss Van and Fafis work. Currently, Anarkitty has focused on Pop Surrealism which is also represented by artists like Walton Ford, Mark Ryden, Ana Bagayan, David LaChapelle, Kehinde Wiley, Tara Mc Pherson, Rebecca Stevenson, Audrey Kawasaki, Stella im Hultberg, Amy Sol and Jaw Cooper.

Most Notable Exhibitions 
 Poisoned Lace Exhibition; The Frameworks Gallery, Belfast, Northern Ireland
 Adorned Exhibition; FB69 Gallery, Münster, Germany

External links 
 
 http://www.fb69.com
 http://www.kunstwissen.de
 http://anarkitty1.deviantart.com/
 http://www.modelmayhem.com/1048014
 http://www.anarkitty.co.uk/
 http://www.fb69.com/index-anarkitty-paintings.htm
 https://web.archive.org/web/20111002155036/http://whiteladyart.com/index.php/artist-interviews/23-qanarkittyq-emma-geary-belfast

Women surrealist artists
British women artists
British surrealist artists
Irish women artists
Irish surrealist artists
1977 births
Living people
People from Larne
Irish artists
Surrealist artists